Florence Foresti (born 8 November 1973 in Vénissieux) is a French comedian and actress.

Life and career
Following her high school studies in literature, theatre and dramatic expression at Saint-Just de Lyon, Florence Foresti entered a school for cinematography at Lyon. After her studies, she appeared in the French television show Thalassa.

At 20, Florence enrolled in a course in classical theatre at Lyon, which she quit after just two days. She had a few other jobs, including working for EDF in Lyon, before finally becoming a computer graphics artist. But she didn't give up on her artistic ambitions, and in 1998 made her début at the café-théâtre Le nOmbril du mOnde ("The navel of the world"), as part of an all woman trio Les Taupes Models (a pun between French "Model Moles" and English "Top Models") with Céline Ianucci and Cécile Giroud, while simultaneously working as a computer graphics artist. The trio was noticed while touring and Anne Roumanoff proposed to make the act the first part of her show. Florence Foresti's career was launched.

In 2001 her first one-woman show, Manquerait plus qu'elle soit drôle ("The only thing missing is that she be funny") won the Jury prize at the Antibes festival. Her style bears comparison with that of Muriel Robin and Sylvie Joly, as well as with some of the 'attitude' and voices of Dieudonné M'bala M'bala and Élie Semoun. She appeared in the Stéphane Bern programme 20h 10 pétantes, and then on Laurent Ruquier's On a tout essayé, playing zany characters.

In 2005 she starts her second one-woman show, Florence Foresti fait des sketchs ("Florence Foresti Makes sketches").

In July 2007, she gave birth to her daughter, Toni . In the wake, she plays in a play L'Abribus with Philippe Elno.

From May 2009 to April 2011 she staged her show MotherFucker. She explained the Anglo-Saxon directness of the title in an interview with Paris Match: "I asked myself, can one remain a woman, while still being a full-time mother? This question affected me so much that I dubbed my show MotherFucker. And it's a nod to Madonna, my idol. After the birth of her daughter, Lourdes, she appeared in a T-shirt with the word Mother on the front, Fucker on the back. It's so clever, this way of playing with her image, her private life and her playing with words. I stole this."

From 13 to 23 September 2012, the "Foresti Party" begin. Three dates in Lyon ("Foresti Party Lyon") and five in Paris ("Foresti Party Bercy"). This huge show is broadcast live in cinema 23 September.

On 26 February 2016, she hosted the 41st César Awards.

Filmography

References

External links 

 
 Lenombrildumonde.com

1973 births
Living people
People from Vénissieux
French stage actresses
French humorists
French stand-up comedians
French people of Italian descent
French film actresses
Women humorists